Samridh Bawa is an Indian television actor. He is majorly known for his role of Leeladhar Chaturvedi in Life OK's Mere Rang Mein Rangne Waali and Karan Singh Chauhan in Colors TV's Ek Shringaar-Swabhiman and the role of Jigar in Balika Vadhu 2.

Filmography

Television

References 

Living people
Year of birth uncertain
21st-century Indian male actors
Indian male television actors
Male actors from Delhi
Indian male models
Indian male soap opera actors
1990 births